Dying to Say This to You is the second studio album in English by Swedish new wave group The Sounds. It was released on 15 March 2006 in Sweden and 21 March 2006 in the United States. The album blends Swedish-influenced new wave music with a sassy and spunky delivery by vocalist Maja Ivarsson, reminiscent of Blondie. The cover depicts The Misshapes' DJ Leigh Lezark on the left and her friend Alexis Page on the right.

The song "Running Out of Turbo" was featured in a chase scene in the episode "Free Fall" of the American television show CSI: Miami, as well as an episode of the MTV reality show The Hills. The song "Queen of Apology" was remixed by Fall Out Boy vocalist Patrick Stump for the soundtrack release Snakes on a Plane: The Album. The track "Hurt You" is featured in a 2008 TV spot for Geico in the United States.  The song "Tony The Beat" is playing during a party scene at Cora's house in the 2007 movie Music and Lyrics.

Upon its release, Dying to Say This to You received generally favorable reviews from music critics.

Track listing
All tracks written by Jesper Anderberg, Johan Bengtsson, Maja Ivarsson, Fredrik Nilsson and Felix Rodriguez.

¹ Enhanced CD-ROM track remixed by Tommie Sunshine.

Tenth anniversary tour
The Sounds acknowledged and celebrated the tenth anniversary of their album Dying to Say This to You with a U.S. tour (and two shows in Canada) from 15 November to 20 December 2016, performing the entire album live in its original track order; they also played their new single, "Thrill" (released 10 November 2016) as well as a few tracks from their earlier albums Living In America and Crossing the Rubicon.

Personnel

The Sounds
Jesper Anderberg – keyboards
Johan Bengtsson – bass
Maja Ivarsson – vocals
Fredrik Nilsson – drums
Felix Rodriguez – guitar

Other contributors
Steve Beacham – engineer
Melora Creager – cello
Rudyard Lee Cullers – engineer
John B. Davis – management
Micah Gaugh – saxophone
James Iha – producer
Mikael Johnston – engineer
Joe Kara – marketing
Brad Kobylczak – engineer
Paul Q. Kolderie – mixing
Jason Linn – executive producer, A&R
Stephen Murray – artwork, design, cover photo
Alexis Page and Leigh Lezark - Cover Girls
Jeff Saltzman – producer
Geoff Sanoff – engineer
Sandeep Sriram – album coordination
Annie Stocking – backing vocals
Adam Taylor – mix engineering
Jeanie Tracy – backing vocals
Howie Weinberg – mastering
Ken Weinstein – publicity

Chart positions

Album

References

External links
The Sounds Official Website
The Sounds MySpace Page
Album promotional website, with track previews

2006 albums
The Sounds albums
New Line Records albums